Newcastle Coal Measures is a major geologic formation in eastern Australia. Found in the Sydney Basin and Lachlan Orogen, this stratum is up to 1200 metres thick, consisting of dozens of different sub types. Formed between the Changhsingian and Wuchiapingian ages, around 256 to 252 Ma in the Permian. This formation includes coal seams, tuffaceous claystone, siltstone, sandstone, and conglomerate. Medium to coarse-grained sandstone is present, often noticed by bathers at the Bogey Hole. Volcanic constituents of the Newcastle Coal Measures include Nobbys Head, which features Nobbys Tuff.

See also 
 Sydney Basin
 Lachlan Orogen
 Reids Mistake Formation

References 

Geologic formations of Australia
Permian System of Australia
Changhsingian
Wuchiapingian
Coal formations
Coal in Australia
Geology of New South Wales
Formations